Umberto Ambrosoli (born 10 September 1971, in Milan) is an Italian politician.

He was the candidate for the centre-left coalition at the regional election in Lombardy (24–25 February 2013).

In 2009 he published the book Qualunque cosa succeda (Whatever happens)     about his father, the lawyer Giorgio Ambrosoli, murdered   11 July 1979 by William Joseph Aricò, an assassin hired by the banker Michele Sindona . The book was winner of the Tiziano Terzani  and Capalbio  prizes.

In November 2009 he also received an award of merit  from Algiusmi,   the association of law graduates of the University of Milan.

References

1971 births
Living people
Italian politicians
University of Milan alumni